La Bureba is a comarca located in the northeast of the Province of Burgos in the autonomous community of Castile and León, Spain. It is bounded on the north by Las Merindades, east by the Comarca del Ebro, south-east by the Montes de Oca and south-west by the Alfoz de Burgos.

Administrative Entities 
The comarca capital is Briviesca.

Municipalities (44)

Geography
La Bureba is criss-crossed by several small rivers and arroyos that empty into the Ebro river: the Homino, Oroncillo, Oca, and Tirón. The mountain ranges of the northwesternmost end of the Sistema Ibérico are located in La Bureba.

History

See also

 Province of Burgos

Notes

External links
 website of the Province of Burgos delegation

Comarcas of the Province of Burgos